Elso Sterrenberg Barghoorn (June 15, 1915 – January 22, 1984) was an American paleobotanist, called by his student Andrew Knoll, the present Fisher Professor of Natural History at Harvard, "the father of Pre-Cambrian palaeontology."

Barghoorn is best known for discovering in South African rocks fossil evidence of life that is at least 3.4 billion years old. These fossils show that life was present on Earth comparatively soon after the Late Heavy Bombardment (about 3.8 billion years ago).

Barghoorn was born in New York City.  After graduating from Miami University with a BSc and an MSc in biology, Barghoorn obtained his Ph.D. in paleobotany from the Harvard University,  faculty of Biological Sciences, in 1941. After teaching for five years at Amherst College, he joined the Harvard faculty, becoming Fisher Professor of Natural History and Curator of the University's plant fossils collections. He was elected a Fellow of the American Academy of Arts and Sciences in 1950. In 1972 Barghoorn was awarded the Charles Doolittle Walcott Medal from the National Academy of Sciences, of which he was also a member. He was also a member of the National Academy of Sciences (1967) and the American Philosophical Society (1978).

Barghoorn married Margaret Alden MaCleod in 1941, Teresa Joan LaCroix, and Dorothy Dellmer Osgood in 1964. The first two marriages ended in divorce.

References

External links
National Academy of Sciences Biographical Memoir

1915 births
1984 deaths
Scientists from New York City
Miami University alumni
Harvard University alumni
Amherst College faculty
Harvard University faculty
Paleobotanists
Fellows of the American Academy of Arts and Sciences
Charles Doolittle Walcott Medal winners
20th-century American botanists

Members of the American Philosophical Society